Oinountas is a former municipality in Laconia, Peloponnese, Greece. Since the 2011 local government reform it is part of the municipality Sparti, of which it is a municipal unit. The municipal unit has an area of 301.812 km2. The name originates from the Oinountas, a small river that traverses the municipality.

Subdivisions
The municipal unit Oinountas is subdivided into the following communities (constituent villages in brackets):
Koniditsa (Koniditsa, Kopelia, Kouremenos)
Sellasia
Theologos (Agios Ioannis, Theologos, Kalyvia Theologou)
Vamvakou (Vamvakou, Megali Vrysi)
Varvitsa
Vasaras (Vasaras, Veria)
Voutianoi
Vresthena

Geography
The municipal unit Oinountas covers the area between the northeastern part of the Evrotas valley up to the ridge of Parnon Mountain. The river Oinountas flows through the southeastern part of the municipal unit.

History
The municipality Oinountas was first established in 1835, the seat of administration being Vamvakou. It was enlarged in 1840, and the seat moved to Vresthena. It was abolished in 1912, and the municipality was split into the independent communities of Vamvakou, Vresthena, Vasaras and Arachova. It was then re-founded by law 2539/1997 (Kapodistrias Plan) in 1998, covering a larger area, by the merger of the communities Sellasia (the seat of the new municipality), Vasaras, Theologos, Varvitsa, Vamvakou, Koniditsa, Voutianoi, and Vresthena.

Historical population

References

See also
List of settlements in Laconia

Dissolved municipalities and communes in Greece
Sparta
Populated places in Laconia